North Bend is a city in Coos County, Oregon, United States with a population of 9,695 as of the 2010 census. North Bend is surrounded on three sides by Coos Bay, an S-shaped water inlet and estuary where the Coos River enters Coos Bay and borders the city of Coos Bay to the south. North Bend became an incorporated city in 1903.

History
Before Europeans visited the Oregon coast, Native American tribes claimed the Coos Bay region as their homeland for thousands of years. Members of the Coos, Lower Umpqua, Siuslaw and Coquille tribes lived, fished, hunted and gathered along Coos Bay and its estuaries, along rivers, and in meadows and forests.

Approximately 400 years ago, British and Spanish explorers first approached the South Coast. In 1579, Sir Francis Drake is purported to have sought shelter for his ship, the Golden Hinde, around Cape Arago. Trader and explorer Jedediah Smith was in the region seeking furs and the Hudson's Bay Company sent Alexander Roderick McLeod to search for an inland passage.

The 1852 stranding of the schooner Captain Lincoln on the North Spit and the survivors' encampment and rescue brought attention to gold prospectors who came to mine placer from area beaches. In 1853, the Coos Bay Commercial Company arrived from the Rogue Valley and created routes for settlers.

Thomas Symons founded Yarrow in 1863. Louis Simpson bought it in 1902. Simpson brought Yarrow and his father's sawmill site Old Town together in 1903 under the name North Bend.

Empire City was established and was the county seat of government until 1896. Entrepreneurs were drawn to the area's ample natural resources, and sawmills and shipyards at Old Town North Bend and Empire City spurred economic development and attracted workers. Rivers and sloughs provided a means to transport people, forest, agricultural and coal products, and towns provided hubs for inland transportation. Some of the early industries in the area included timber harvesting, shipbuilding, farming, coal mining and salmon canning.

Prior to around 1915, the Coos region was largely isolated from the rest of Oregon due to difficulties in crossing the Coast Range and fording rivers. Instead, the Pacific Ocean was used to link people to other areas, including San Francisco. That was an easier two-day trip compared to traveling inland over rugged terrain. In 1916, trains linked the region to other interior settlements and towns, increasing commercial trade and tourism

Significant urban growth occurred in the 1920s, and during the 1930s to 1950s, large-scale growth occurred. Per the Oregon Bay Area Chamber of Commerce, during the 1930s to 1950s:

Shipyards contracted with the U.S. Government to build minesweepers and rescue tugs for World War II defense purposes. Large national lumber companies set up operations and expanded significantly for the next two decades. Jetty improvements, commercial fishing and crabbing shaped the development of Charleston. The completion of the North Bend Bridge (now Conde McCullough Memorial Bridge) in 1936 and the Roosevelt Highway significantly improved modern transportation connections and provided the final link in opening the Coos region to the outside world. The formerly remote district known as the Coos Bay country had come of age.

During the interregnum of despair between Franklin Roosevelt's election and his inauguration, the only bank in North Bend, the First National, was forced to temporarily close its doors, precipitating a cash-flow crisis for the City of North Bend. The city solved this problem by minting currency using myrtlewood discs printed on a newspaper press. These coins, in denominations from 25 cents to $10, were used to make payroll and the city promised to redeem them for cash as soon as it became available.

However, when the bank reopened and the city appealed for people to bring their myrtlewood money in to redeem it, many opted to keep their tokens as collector's items. After several appeals, the city gave up and announced that the tokens would remain legal tender in the city of North Bend in perpetuity. Until the 1960s, people occasionally did cash in their tokens, but the remaining pieces have become very valuable through scarcity and historical interest. Fewer than 10 full sets are believed to exist.

Geography

Climate
The climate in North Bend and surrounds can be described as a very humid version of the Mediterranean climate or a dry-summer version of an oceanic climate. Cool breezes off the Pacific moderate the city's climate year round. Rain is abundant in winter, due to moist low pressure troughs from the Pacific Ocean. Fog often blankets the coastal fringe in summer due to the temperature gradient between the cool Pacific Ocean and the warm inland, which serves to keep temperatures markedly cooler than in Eugene or even Seattle. Snow almost never falls in the city, but can be heavy in the adjacent Oregon Coast Range. Annually, the city sees 25 days that fail to reach  and just 12 days with a temperature of freezing or lower.

The most recent temperature numbers show North Bend to be the northernmost subtropical climate weather station in North America according to the Trewartha climate classification. There are now eight months averaging above 50 °F (10 °C.)

Demographics

2010 census
As of the census of 2010, there were 9,695 people, 4,113 households, and 2,495 families residing in the city. The racial makeup of the city was 89.3% White, 0.3% African American, 2.3% Native American, 1.7% Asian, 0.2% Pacific Islander, 1.3% from other races, and 4.9% from two or more races. Hispanic or Latino people of any race were 5.8% of the population.

North Bend is the second largest city in Oregon's Bay Area.

28.7% of households had children under the age of 18 living with them, 43.9% were married couples living together, 12.4% had a female householder with no husband present, 4.4% had a male householder with no wife present, and 39.3% were non-families. 30.8% of all households were made up of individuals, and 13.6% had someone living alone who was 65 years of age or older. The average household size was 2.33 and the average family size was 2.87.

The median age in the city was 41.3 years. 21.9% of residents were under the age of 18; 8.8% were between the ages of 18 and 24; 23.3% were from 25 to 44; 28.2% were from 45 to 64; and 17.6% were 65 years of age or older. The gender makeup of the city was 47.6% male and 52.4% female.

2000 census
Per the 2000 census, there were 9,544 people, 3,969 households, and 2,556 families residing in North Bend and the population density was 2,445.7 people per square mile (944.9/km). There were 4,291 housing units at an average density of 1,099.6 per square mile (424.8/km). The ethnic statistics for the city were 92.49% White, 0.38% African American, 1.79% Native American, 1.31% Asian, 0.34% Pacific Islander, 1.03% from other races, and 2.67% from two or more races. Hispanic or Latino of any race were 3.71% of the population.

There were 3,969 households, out of which 30.9% had children under the age of 18 living with them, 49.8% were married couples living together, 11.5% had a female householder with no husband present, and 35.6% were non-families. The statistics for how many male householders without a wife present was not recorded by the 2000 Census. 30.1% of all households were made up of individuals, and 13.9% had someone living alone who was 65 years of age or older. The average household size was 2.35 and the average family size was 2.91. North Bend's population dispersal was 24.6% under the age of 18, 7.9% from 18 to 24, 25.8% from 25 to 44, 24.6% from 45 to 64, and 17.1% who were 65 years of age or older. The median age was 40 years. For every 100 females, there were 90.3 males. For every 100 females age 18 and over, there were 87.5 males. The median income for a household in the city was $33,333, and the median income for a family was $41,755. Male median income was $34,494 and female median income was $23,244. The per capita income for the city was $16,703. About 11.8% of families and 14.8% of the population were below the poverty line, including 20.0% of those under age 18 and 13.0% of those age 65 or over.

Arts and culture

North Bend has a public recreational boat ramp that accesses Coos Bay, along with a concrete pier and boardwalk area completed in 2010 per North Bend's regional urban renewal policy. North Bend has a public Olympic-sized indoor pool. The Pony Village Mall in North Bend is an indoor shopping mall. The Mill Casino is a Native American gaming entertainment center in North Bend with a hotel, gambling, and restaurants.

Tribal government
The seat of the Coquille Indian Tribe's tribal government is located in North Bend, which is a United States recognized sovereign tribe of Native Americans who have traditionally lived on the southern Oregon Coast. The Coquille Tribe owns several businesses, including The Mill Casino and Hotel, an organic cranberry growing and packing operation in North Bend, Heritage Place assisted living center, and ORCA Communications, a telecommunications provider.

Education
The North Bend School District provides K–12 public education for residents of the area.

Media

Radio
KTEE 94.9 FM (commercial)
KOOS 107.3 FM (commercial)
KBBR 1340 AM (commercial)
KMHS 1420 AM (high school)

Notable people
 

Louis J. Simpson (1877–1949) shipping and timber magnate

Transportation

Air
The Southwest Oregon Regional Airport near North Bend and Coos Bay is the only commercial airport on the Oregon Coast.

Road
The Conde McCullough Memorial Bridge is located in North Bend.

Current pavement in North Bend and Northern Coos Bay was laid in 2013.

The McCullough bridge is currently being repainted via Operation Infinity.

See also
 Coast Guard Air Station North Bend
 Steamboats of Coos Bay (historical)
 Steamboats of the Oregon Coast (historical)

References

External links

 City of North Bend (official website)
 Entry for North Bend in the Oregon Blue Book
 

 
Cities in Oregon
Populated coastal places in Oregon
Cities in Coos County, Oregon
1903 establishments in Oregon
Populated places established in 1903